Groton-Dunstable Regional High School (GDRHS) is a high school located in Groton, Massachusetts, United States, and serves the communities of Groton and Dunstable in the Groton-Dunstable Regional School District.  While GDRHS is the only public high school located within those communities students from Groton may also attend the public Nashoba Valley Technical High School and students from Dunstable may attend the public Greater Lowell Technical High School.  Approximately 810 students attend GDRHS and they are primarily graduates of Groton-Dunstable Regional Middle School.  GDRHS has a primarily college preparatory curriculum, with approximately 87% of its students attending four-year colleges and over 90% attending two- or four-year colleges upon graduation in 2010.

History
The earliest incarnation of GDRHS was as the grammar school that was held in Groton town center for which there are funding records as far back as 1758.  The residency of the grammar school migrated between the district schools and in 1808 was kept for four months in District school number 1, then two months in number 2, two months in number 3, and two months in number five.

While Lawrence Academy had long provided private secondary school opportunities in town, a committee was appointed in November 1855 to consider establishing a new high school.  On Monday, December 5, 1859 the first public high school opened  in the lower hall of the Town House (Town Hall).
For some time in the 1860s, the high school was held in the upper part of the Gerrish building at Groton Center, before moving into the new District Number 1 school, built in 1870 at a cost of $32,000. On March 2, 1874, the district schools, were named according to town vote with the high school being named Butler Grammar School after Caleb Butler, former principal of Lawrence Academy, and town historian.  A new high school was built in 1927.  Now known as the recently closed Prescott Elementary, it continued to be known as the Butler School for some time.

The regional school district was established in 1967 with the high school located on Main St. in Groton.   In 1997, the school adopted 4x4 block scheduling.  In 1999, the "new gym" at the Main Street campus was renovated and renamed as the Peter Twomey Youth Center (PTYC) in order to honor a then recently deceased student.  The PTYC is now "...a self-supporting facility that provides space for youth athletic leagues, adult education, and youth groups in Groton and Dunstable."  With the student population expanding from 370 in 1993 to its current levels, a new building was needed.  In 2003 at cost of $35 million, the high school relocated to its current location near the border between the two towns it serves.

Campus
GD's  campus lies on Chicopee Row on the Groton side of the Groton-Dunstable border.  The current site is just to the east of Reedy Meadow and its fields are bordered by eastern white pine, as well as vernal pools including Bauch Pond and the Ennis Puddle.  Near the upper fields and entrance to the grounds is the "Spirit Rock", a large boulder which student groups and individuals have periodically repainted since the spring of 2007.

The main campus building was designed by HMFH Architects to allow outside light into nearly every room and thus features windows along many interior walls.  An exception to that rule is Mr. Donnelly's technology room as well as the Black Box Theater which hosts both school and local community performances.  Also located within the school is Public-access television cable TV station, The Groton Channel.

In November 2013, students and their families were notified that excessive levels of coliform bacteria had been detected in the school's water supply.  The system was disinfected and the problem was apparently resolved.  The quality of drinking water at the school had been a concern since the new building's completion in 2003.

Curriculum
Most Groton-Dunstable students undertake a college preparatory curriculum that includes four credits of English, three credits of mathematics, social sciences, and laboratory-based sciences inscluding integrated science, two credits each of a single foreign language and physical/behavioral health, one credit of fine arts and one half credit of computer applications.  Seniors must also complete a senior project.   As G-D is on a 4x4 block schedule, full credit courses are equivalent to a year-long course in a school with traditional 40-50 minute periods.  A small number of students with significant special needs instead participate in the Life Skills Experiential Learning program.

Students can choose from 11 advanced placement coursesto earn college credits.

The English department requires two courses focused on the role of the hero, one on American literature and one on Shakespeare and Chaucer. Electives include courses in both print and broadcast journalism, videography, film studies, theater arts, and  creative writing classes along with an English literature AP course.  The social studies core requires a credit in world history, and two in United States history.  Humanities electives include contemporary issues, women's studies, economics, marketing and entrepreneurship, the student and the law, international business, accounting, modern European history, sociology, public speaking/debate and the U.S. History AP course.

Groton-Dunstable's foreign language offerings include Spanish, and Latin. There are AP electives for Latin and Spanish.

Groton-Dunstable's science/technology department offers courses in molecular biology, anatomy & physiology, environmental studies, astronomy, engineering design & construction. Its AP offerings include biology, chemistry, environmental science and physics (C: Electricity and Magnetism).  Through the math and business & technology departments, computer oriented electives include Java, digital imaging, and web page design.  AP level courses are offered through the math department for both calculus tests as well as for statistics.

The visual arts program includes sequences in studio art, design, and photography. Music courses include concert band, chorus, and chamber chorus.

In addition to the usual sports and conditioning options, the physical and behavioral health program provides courses in child development, health, life-management, and psychology.

Notable alumni
Kristen Gilbert - serial killer
Steve Kornacki - political scientist and host of "Up With Steve Kornacki" on MSNBC
Dan Shaughnessy - sports journalist and television personality

Principals
??David Quattrone
?1985Howard Gilmore
19851995William E. McGuirk
19952007Joseph P. Dillon, Oversaw transition to new building and campus.
20072010Shelley Marcus Cohen
20102011Stephen Dlott
20122016Michael Mastrullo
20162022Michael Woodlock
2022PresentStephen Sierpina

References

External links
Official site

Schools in Middlesex County, Massachusetts
Public high schools in Massachusetts
Education in Groton, Massachusetts